Aimée Iacobescu (1 June 1946 – 27 March 2018) was a Romanian actress. She appeared in seventeen films and television shows between 1967 and 2009. Iacobescu is buried at Ghencea Cemetery.

Selected filmography
 Sept hommes et une garce (1967)
 Haiducii lui Șaptecai (1971) - Domnița Ralu
 Cu mâinile curate (1972)
 The Doom (1976)
 State de România - Student la Sorbona (2009) - Brigitte

References

External links

1946 births
2018 deaths
Romanian film actresses
Burials at Ghencea Cemetery
Deaths from cancer in Romania
People from Buzău County